"Park Avenue" is a song by post-hardcore band Girls Against Boys, released in 1998. It was the lead single from their album Freak*on*ica and is their only single to chart in the United States.

Background
"Park Avenue" was released as the lead single from the band's 1998 album Freak*on*ica. The album was the band's first (and to date, only) album to be released on a major label, Geffen Records. Both the single and the overall album had an electronic-influenced sound, a departure from the post-hardcore genre that the band had mainly presented beforehand. The single of "Park Avenue" consisted of a remix of the song "Black Hole" (in which the original version was found on Freak*on*ica) in addition to the outtake track "EPR" (which also appeared on the soundtrack to the film Permanent Midnight).

In the U.S., the single peaked at No. 28 on the Mainstream Rock Tracks chart. It was the band's only appearance on a Billboard songs chart in the U.S.; however, the single peaked at No. 83 on the UK Singles Chart. In the UK, "Park Avenue" became the band's fourth and final appearance on the country's singles chart. A music video was produced for "Park Avenue" as well.

Track listing

Personnel
 Girls Against Boys
 Alexis Fleisig – drums
 Eli Janney – keyboards, bass guitar, backing vocals, engineering, mixing
 Scott McCloud – lead vocals, guitar
 Johnny Temple – bass guitar
Production and additional personnel
 Nick Launay – production
 Mike Scielzi – mixing
 Greg Calbi – mastering

Charts

Release history

References

1998 singles
1998 songs
Girls Against Boys songs